Danayeri (also, Danayer and Malyr Danair) is a village in the Goygol Rayon of Azerbaijan.  The village forms part of the municipality of Qızılca.

References 

Populated places in Goygol District